Daniel Fehlow (born 21 February 1975 in Berlin, Germany) is a German television and voice actor.

He has played Leon Moreno in the German television soap opera Gute Zeiten, schlechte Zeiten since 1996. He is the voice of Channing Tatum in films dubbed into German.

Television filmography
 Gute Zeiten, schlechte Zeiten as Leon Moreno (1996–present)
 Verfolgt! – Mädchenjagd auf der Autobahn as Stefan (1998)
 Hinter dem Regenbogen as Oliver (1999)
 Schloss Einstein as bodyguard Bodo Kaminski (2001)
 Alarm für Cobra 11 – Die Autobahnpolizei as Ben Winter (2007)

External links
Role profile: Leon Moreno

1975 births
Living people
German male soap opera actors
German male television actors